G. Konduru mandal is one of the 20 mandals in the NTR district of the Indian state of Andhra Pradesh. It was used to be a part of Krishna district and was reorganized to be a part of newly formed NTR district on 4 April 2022.

Villages 
List of Villages in G Konduru

 Atukuru
 Bhimavarappadu
 Chegireddipadu
 Cheruvu Madhavaram
 Chevuturu
 Duggiralapadu
 Gaddamanugu
 Ganginenipalem
 Gurrajupalem
 Haveli Mutyalampadu
 Kadimpothavaram
 Kandulapadu
 Kavuluru
 Koduru
 Konduru
 Kuntamukkala
 Loya
 Munagapadu
 Nandigama
 Narasayagudem
 Petrampadu
 Pinapaka
 Sunnampadu
 Telladevarapadu
 Velagaleru
 Vellaturu
 Venkatapuram

References 

Mandals in NTR district